Qadas is a sub-district located in the Al-Mawasit District, Taiz Governorate, Yemen. Qadas had a population of 42,976 according to the 2004 census.

Villages
Al-Qatin 
Al-Maghdar 
Al-Aqrud 
Al-Swirah 
Radaa 
Bani Khurasan Kafana
Bani Salah
Bani Mustafa 
Wadi al-'Ajab 
Hulqan 
Al-zkhv 
Asidah 
Dha Al-jamal
al-Qaheva 
Eshrouh Bani Ali
Akarod Asfal
Al-Sadah Wa al-Dai'sah 
al-Batnh 
Al-Diya' 
Al-Hajar
Al-Jahili 
Al-Damanah
Bani Hiba
Al-Rad'a 
Bani Saeed
Al-Mamerh 
Gohan
Amqan
Al-Dhaf 
Al-Ahsun 
Al-Dakhl 
Al-Nebahnh 
Bani Mansur 
Al-Makisha 
Al-Hanahan 
Al-Jund 
khusila 
Bani Saleh
Bani Saadan 
Krefah 
Al-Tayy
Al-Asserah
Al-Majina 
Al-Mfalha 
Al-Sadah 
Al-Ahjum

References

Sub-districts in Al-Mawasit District